Tighe Dombrowski (born March 4, 1982) is an American soccer player, currently without a club.

Dombrowski played four years of college soccer for the UW–Milwaukee Panthers of the University of Wisconsin–Milwaukee from 2000–2003, during which he was named first team All-Horizon League three times. He was named an honorable mention All-American following his senior season in 2003. Dombrowski tallied sixteen goals and thirteen assists in his time at UW–Milwaukee, and helped them advance to the second round of the NCAA Tournament his sophomore, junior, and senior years. In 2002, he played for the Des Moines Menace in the Premier Development League. In 2003, he played for the Chicago Fire Reserves.

After graduating from UW–Milwaukee, Dombrowski was drafted fiftieth overall in the 2004 MLS SuperDraft by the San Jose Earthquakes, and signed to a developmental contract. Along with the rest of his Earthquakes teammates, he moved to Houston for the 2006 season, but was signed by Swedish then-Division 1 (effectively the third division) side IK Sirius Fotboll in April 2006, having impressed the coaching staff at Studenternas IP during his trial in February and March. In July 2007, Tighe helped Sirius save three points by scoring two goals in the last minutes of the game against Jönköpings Södra IF, turning the game from 0–1 to 2–1 in the span of six minutes.

Dombrowski had a trial with New York Red Bulls but did not earn a contract and later signed with USL-1 side Minnesota Thunder.

Personal
Tighe is one of the Dombrowski brothers, all of whom are also pro soccer players: Scott Dombrowski, Zeke Dombrowski, Chad Dombrowski and Neil Dombrowski.

References

External links
Dombrowski on IK Sirius FK web page

1982 births
Living people
American expatriate soccer players
Des Moines Menace players
Chicago Fire U-23 players
Minnesota Thunder players
People from West Allis, Wisconsin
Soccer players from Wisconsin
San Jose Earthquakes players
Milwaukee Panthers men's soccer players
USL First Division players
USL League Two players
Major League Soccer players
San Jose Earthquakes draft picks
Sportspeople from the Milwaukee metropolitan area
IK Sirius Fotboll players
American soccer players
Association football defenders
American expatriate sportspeople in Sweden